Udeoides bonakandaiensis is a moth in the family Crambidae. It was described by Koen V. N. Maes in 2006. It is found in Cameroon.

References

Endemic fauna of Cameroon
Moths described in 2006
Spilomelinae